South Plymouth is the portion of Plymouth, Massachusetts, United States that covers much of the southern section of the town beginning at the Pine Hills, a large, mostly undeveloped forested area south of Plymouth Beach, Chiltonville and South Pond. The remainder of the section is south and east of the northeastern entrance to Myles Standish State Forest, stretching to the Bourne and Wareham town lines.

Villages and neighborhoods in South Plymouth are:
 Rocky Point
 The Pinehills
 Buttermilk Bay
 Manomet
 Priscilla Beach
 White Horse Beach
 Manomet Heights
 Manomet Bluffs
 Fishermans Landing
 Churchill Landing
 Colony Beach
 Pilgrim Beach
 Cedar Bushes
 Manomet Beach
 Vallerville
 Ocean Aire Beach
 Surfside Beach
 Bayside Beach
 Ellisville
 Harlow's Landing
 Eastland Heights
 Cedarville
 Nameloc Heights
 Pondville
 Halfway Pond
 Long Pond
 West Wind Shores
 White Island Shores

See also
 Neighborhoods in Plymouth, Massachusetts

Plymouth, Massachusetts
Neighborhoods in Plymouth, Massachusetts